Ethmia powelli is a moth in the family Depressariidae. It is found in the Florida Keys in the United States.

The ground color of the forewings is silvery white with numerous black spots. The ground color of the hindwings is unicolorous pale gray with dark gray at margin. Adults are on wing in June and August.

Etymology
The species is named in honor of Professor J. A. Powell.

References

Moths described in 1988
powelli